Serbia competed at the 2013 World Games held in Cali, Colombia.

Medalists

Air sports 

Milica Marinković won the bronze medal in the women's paragliding accuracy event.

References 

Nations at the 2013 World Games
2013 in Serbian sport
2013